Stephen of Penthièvre, Count of Tréguier, 3rd Lord of Richmond (1058/62 – 21 April 1136) was a Breton noble and a younger son of Odo, Count of Penthièvre and Agnes of Cornouaille, sister of Hoël II, Duke of Brittany. In 1093, he succeeded to the title of Count of Tréguier; in 1098, he succeeded his brother Alain as Lord of Richmond in Yorkshire, England.

Life
He is sometimes misidentified as "Stephen, Count of Brittany" in the court documents of King Henry I. This may be due to his Breton heritage, or the fact that he owned large estates there, but in fact at the time Brittany was a Duchy ruled by Alan IV, Duke of Brittany.

Stephen was a benefactor of religious houses. In 1110, he and his wife, Hawise, founded the Augustine Abbey of St Croix in Guingamp. On an unknown date, he is recorded as having donated property to Rumbaugh Priory for the souls of his wife and children.

He was the paternal grandfather of Conan IV, Duke of Brittany.

Family
He married Hawise of Blois, also known as Hawise of Guingamp, daughter of Theobald III, Count of Blois and Adele of Valois. Their children were:

Geoffrey II "Boterel", Count of Penthièvre, married Hawise de Dol, by whom he had issue. Geoffrey received Stephen's Breton lands and was a supporter of Empress Matilda during The Anarchy.
Alan de Bretagne, 1st Earl of Richmond (died 15 September 1146) married Bertha of Brittany, by whom he had issue, including his heir Conan IV, Duke of Brittany. Alan is also known as Alan Niger II; he received Stephen's English lands and supported Stephen, King of England during The Anarchy.
Henry, Count of Tréguier, married Mathilde de Vendome,
 Maud, married Walter de Gaunt, by whom she had issue, including:
 Gilbert de Gant, Earl of Lincoln
 Agnes de Gaunt, married William de Mohun of Dunster, 1st Earl of Somerset.
 Olive, married firstly Henry de Fougères, by whom she had issue; secondly William de St. John.
 Theophania (Tiphanie), married Rabel de Tancarville, Chamberlain of Normandy, by whom she had issue 
 Eléonore, married Alan de Dinan, by whom she had issue.

He died on 21 April 1136 and was buried in the Abbey of St Mary at York.

Ancestors

Notes

References

Sources

1050s births
1060s births
1136 deaths
11th-century English nobility
12th-century English nobility
Counts of Penthièvre
Counts of Tréguier
Earls of Richmond
Burials in North Yorkshire